William Samuel Symonds (13 December 181815 September 1887) was an English cleric, geologist and author.

Life
He was born in Hereford, and educated at Cheltenham College and Christ's College, Cambridge, where he graduated B.A. in 1842. Having taken holy orders he was appointed curate of Offenham, near Evesham in 1843, and two years later he was presented to the living of Pendock in Worcestershire, the advowson of which, together with the lordship of the manor, had been bought by his grandfather, Samuel Beale of Upton-on-Severn. Here he remained until 1877. While at Offenham he became acquainted with HE Strickland and from him developed an interest in natural history and geology, which consumed him from that point. He was one of the founders of the Woolhope Naturalists' Field Club (1851) and of the Malvern Naturalists' Field Club (1853), and was an active member of the Cotteswold Field Club and other local societies.

In 1858 he edited an edition of Hugh Miller's Cruise of the "Betsey." He was the author of numerous essays on the geology of the Malvern country, notably of a paper "On the passage-beds from the Upper Silurian rocks into the Lower Old Red Sandstone at Ledbury" (Quart. Journ. Geol. Soc. 1860). His principal work was Records of the Rocks (1872), indexed by the young Caroline Alice Roberts. He was author of Stones of the Valley (1857), Old Bones, or Notes for Young Naturalists (1859, 2nd ed. 1864), and other popular works including historical romances such as Malvern Chase and Hanley Castle. He died at Cheltenham on 15 September 1887.

His daughter Hyacinth was the second wife of the Scottish naturalist Sir William Jardine, 7th Baronet, and then the second wife of the great botanist Sir Joseph Dalton Hooker, one of the closest friends of Charles Darwin.

Notes

References
Rev. J.D. La Touche, A Sketch of the Life of the Rev. W.S. Symonds

External links
 Literary heritage entry
 
 

1818 births
1887 deaths
People from Hereford
Alumni of Christ's College, Cambridge
19th-century English Anglican priests
19th-century British geologists
English historical novelists
English male novelists
19th-century English novelists
19th-century English male writers